The Ancona trolleybus system forms part of the public transport network of the city and comune of Ancona, in the Marche region, central Italy.  In operation since 1949, the system presently comprises only one urban route.

Services
The route comprising the present Ancona trolleybus system is:
 1/4 Piazza IV Novembre - Tavernelle

This is an amalgamation of the previous lines 1 and 4.  The amalgamated line has the following itinerary: viale della Vittoria, piazza Cavour, piazza Roma, Archi, Ancona railway station, viale Giordano Bruno, piazza Ugo Bassi, via Torresi, Tavernelle (terminus).

Trolleybus fleet

Retired trolleybuses
The following now retired trolleybuses have been used in Ancona:
 Fiat 668 F/110 (12 trolleybuses, Stanga bodies, nos 1-12), served from 1949-50 to 1983;
 Fiat 668 F/110 (4 trolleybuses, Stanga bodies, nos 13-16), served from 1952-53 to 1983;
 Fiat 2401 (5 trolleybuses, Cansa bodies, nos 17-21), served from 1956-57 to 1987.
 Menarini F201/2LU (6 trolleybuses, nos 1-6), entered service 1983; rebuilt 2001 with electrical equipment by Albiero & Bocca; withdrawn 2013;
 Menarini F201/2LU (3 trolleybuses, nos 7-9), entered service 1987; rebuilt 2001 with electrical equipment by Albiero & Bocca; withdrawn 2013.

Current fleet
Ancona's present trolleybus fleet is made up of only the following two types:
 Solaris Trollino (3 trolleybuses), entered service 2013.
 Breda F22 (6 trolleybuses), entered service 2014.

See also

List of trolleybus systems in Italy

References

Notes

Books

External links

 Images of the Ancona trolleybus system, at railfaneurope.net
 Images of the Ancona trolleybus system, at photorail.com
 Trolleybus city: Ancona (Italy) Trolleymotion. 
 

This article is based upon a translation of the Italian language version as at July 2011.

Ancona
Ancona
Ancona